Widewater Beach is an unincorporated community in Stafford County, in the U.S. state of Virginia. The community is adjacent to Widewater State Park.

References

Unincorporated communities in Virginia
Unincorporated communities in Stafford County, Virginia